Mahibadhoo is an island town in central Maldives, and is the capital of South Ari Atoll.

Geography

Demography

Governance 
Mahibadhoo island is governed by the Secretariat of Mahibadhoo Council. The island council is administered by the local government authority.

Councilors

President Rashad Ali.

Vice President Ibrahim Shathir.

Councilor Shaufa Adam.

Councilor Mohamed Maumoon.

Councilor Muneefa Adam.

Executives

Secretary General Gasim Sihan.

Council Executive Mohamed Faiz.

A.Council Executive Mohamed Naushad.

The Mahibadhoo Constituency, which includes neighboring Kun'burudhoo and Hangnaameedhoo, is represented in the parliament by Ahmed Thoriq, a parliamentary member of the Progressive Party of Maldives (PPM). In April 2019, Ahmed Thoriq was elected for a second term, and will represent the constituency at least until 2024.

Economy
With a population of around 2500 people, the livelihood of most families depend on fishing and tourism.

Yellowfin Tuna fishing is the primary source of income for most. A number of smaller fishing boats live on the sale of reef fish to nearby tourist resorts.

A significant portion of the Millennial and Gen Z population of Mahibadhoo are employed at tourist resorts. As of 2022, nine locally owned guesthouses operate from the island.

As the atoll's governing island, divisions and branches of several public offices are based in Mahibadhoo. Such institutions are a primary source of income for many.

Mahibadhoo has also seen a surge in small businesses in early 21st century, ranging from coffee shops and grocery stores, to guesthouses and speedboat ferry services.

On January 12, 2020, a state-sponsored grouper farming project was launched in Mahibadhoo, led by the Ministry of Fisheries, Marine Resources and Agriculture. The pilot project is part of the sustainable fisheries resource development project of the ministry, and is being funded by the World Bank.

Infrastructure and Services
Notable public buildings in the island include the atoll council, atoll hospital, the island council, police station, atoll education center, a branch of BML, a magistrate court, a division of STELCO and of FENAKA corporation, an ice plant, and four mosques (one of them no longer being used for worship).

The streets of Mahibadhoo, with the exception of some roads, are paved with stone. Other public places include a FIFA-approved turf football ground, south harbor and its adjoining park, the north harbor, a netball ground and a mat-floored futsal pitch. On the western coast of the island resides "Bun'baru Beach" for the public, and a private beach exclusively for tourists.

Private facilities in Mahibadhoo include guesthouses, speedboat ferry service providers, coffee shops and restaurants.

Education
In Mahibadhoo, education for adolescents begin from baby-nursery at the Mahibadhoo Pre-school. Primary and secondary schooling, up to O'levels (Grade 10) is provided by the Atoll Education Center. Students can choose from business, science or B-tech stream to major in. Students in pursuit of high school education continue their studies in capital Male'.

Mahibadhoo exhibits a campus of Villa College, which offers courses from certificate level to bachelor's and master's degrees, depending on demand for course application.

Healthcare

The Atoll Hospital is the primary healthcare provider for the people of South Ari Atoll. Some of the services available at the hospital include E.C.G, laboratory investigations, labor, x-ray, ultra sound scanning, vaccination, and medical examination as part of renewing/applying for work-permit. Specialist services including gynecology, pediatrics and dental treatments are included in the hospital's readily available services. The hospital holds an annual circumcision camp as well.

Procare Clinic and Dental Centre operates as a private clinic, and provides occasional specialist consultations, in addition to facilities including x-ray, laboratory investigations, eye-checkup and dentistry.

Sports and Recreation 
Mahibadhoo is known nationwide for its endeavors in sports, remarkably for the development of football players. The island is known worldwide for its football ground that has been featured on the worlds most famous and biggest platforms like FIFA, AFC, 433, (Contents by Mohamed Naushad). Mahibadhoo is the home town of former national team goalkeeper, Imran Mohamed, and former national team striker, Ahmed Thoriq. The two of them have retired from professional football. Other notable football players from Mahibadhoo include Samooh Ali, Asadhulla Abdhulla, Hussain Niyaz Mohamed,

In 2010, Imran and Tariq founded Mahibadhoo Sports Club. The Mahibadhoo Sports Club Academy trains kids to become future football stars and to lead a healthy childhood.

References

Islands of the Maldives
Populated places in the Maldives